Do Biran-e Olya (also Romanized as Do Bīrān-e ‘Olyā; also known as Dhuberān, Dobīrān, and Dow Vīrān) is a village in Sarab Rural District, in the Central District of Eyvan County, Ilam Province, Iran. At the 2006 census, its population was 524, in 116 families. The village is populated by Kurds.

References 

Populated places in Eyvan County
Kurdish settlements in Ilam Province